KSPE (94.5 FM, "La Musical 94.5 FM") is a commercial radio station that is licensed to Ellwood, California, a district of Goleta in Santa Barbara County. It is owned by Rincon Broadcasting and broadcasts a classic regional Mexican music format. The KSPE studios and offices are on East Cota Street in Santa Barbara and the transmitter is located on West Camino Cielo in the Los Padres National Forest.

History
The station first signed on on April 6, 1989 as KCQR, an album-oriented rock station calling itself "94 Rock". It was owned by South West Broadcasting, Inc. In 1994, the station was sold to Spectacular Broadcasting, Inc. for $1.2 million. The following year, KCQR changed its call sign to KSPE-FM to match that of co-owned station KSPE (1490 AM) in Santa Barbara and began simulcasting the AM's regional Mexican music format, with both stations branded "La Musical".

In October 1998, Spectacular sold KSPE-FM and its AM counterpart to Jacor Communications (later Clear Channel Communications) for $4.6 million. The AM station switched its call letters to KBKO, while KSPE-FM was separately programmed as "La Preciosa", playing regional Mexican oldies.

On January 11, 2007, Clear Channel sold all of its radio stations in Santa Barbara, including KSPE-FM, to Rincon Broadcasting for $17.3 million.

KSPE-FM changed call letters in 2010, first to KIST-FM on July 19, then to KFYZ on September 10. The Spanish oldies format remained until December 21, 2010, when the station flipped to top 40 with the branding "Z94.5".

In September 2017, the station reverted to its previous classic regional Mexican format, this time with the call letters KSPE and branded as "La Musical".

References

External links

SPE
Radio stations established in 1989
1989 establishments in California
SPE
Oldies radio stations in the United States